Visa requirements for Saint Lucian citizens are administrative entry restrictions imposed by the authorities of foreign states on citizens of Saint Lucia.  Saint Lucian citizens had visa-free or visa on arrival access to 146 countries and territories, ranking the Saint Lucian passport 33rd in the world in terms of travel freedom according to the Henley Passport Index.

Saint Lucia signed a mutual visa waiver agreement with Schengen Area countries on 28 May 2015.

Visa requirement map

Visa requirements 
Visa requirements for holders of normal passports traveling for tourist purposes:

Dependent, Disputed, or Restricted territories
Unrecognized or partially recognized countries

Dependent and autonomous territories

See also
 Visa policy of Saint Lucia
 Saint Lucian passport
 Caribbean passport

References and Notes
References

Notes

Saint Lucia
Foreign relations of Saint Lucia